Navega is the debut album by the Cape Verdean musician Mayra Andrade, released in 2006. It is sung in Cape Verdean Creole language. The title means "Sail".

The album won the "German Records Critics' Award" ("Preis der deutschen Schallplattenkritik"). Its jury is composed of 114 musical journalists.

Track listing

Reception 
The album won the Preis der Deutschen Schallplattenkritik in the World Music and Folklore category.

References

2006 debut albums
Mayra Andrade albums